Gérard Depardieu (born 27 December 1948) is a  French actor, filmmaker, businessman and vineyard owner. He is one of the most prolific actors in film history, having completed over 250 movies since 1967.

Filmography

Theatre

References
 
 

Depardieu, Gerard
Depardieu, Gerard